The Lanarkshire Football League was formed in 1898 in Scotland as one of several supplementary football leagues that were created in order to increase the number of fixtures for Scottish Football League clubs. The league existed for only three season, Motherwell won the 1898–99 competition by defeating Airdrieonians in a very belated play-off in May 1900 and Albion Rovers the 1900–01 edition, the 1899–1900 edition was unfinished.

Membership
Airdrieonians 1898–1899, 1900-1901
Albion Rovers 1898–1901
Carfin Emmett 1899–1900
Hamilton Academical 1898–1899, 1900–1901
Motherwell 1898–1899, 1900–1901
Royal Albert 1898–1900
Wishaw F.C 1899-1900
Wishaw Thistle 1899–1900
Wishaw United 1900–1901

See also
Scottish Football (Defunct Leagues)

References

Defunct football leagues in Scotland
1898 establishments in Scotland
Sports leagues established in 1898
Sports leagues disestablished in 1902
1902 disestablishments in Scotland

he:ליגות כדורגל מוספות#ליגת הכדורגל של לנרקשייר